Arnaldo de Mattos (born 15 January 1947), known as Arnaldo, is a Brazilian footballer. He competed in the men's tournament at the 1968 Summer Olympics.

References

External links
 

1947 births
Living people
Brazilian footballers
Brazil international footballers
Olympic footballers of Brazil
Footballers at the 1968 Summer Olympics
Footballers from São Paulo
Association footballers not categorized by position